Greensburg is a city in and the county seat of Westmoreland County, Pennsylvania, United States, and a part of the Pittsburgh Metro Area. The city lies within the Laurel Highlands and the ecoregion of the Western Allegheny Plateau. The city is named after Nathanael Greene, a major general of the Continental Army in the American Revolutionary War. The population was 14,976 at the 2020 census.

It is evident as the city's population doubles during work hours. In 2007, Greensburg was ranked as one of the "Best Places to Retire" in Pennsylvania by U.S. News & World Report.

History
After the end of the Revolutionary War, an inn was built along a wagon trail that stretched from Philadelphia west over the Appalachian Mountains to Fort Pitt, now the city of Pittsburgh. A tiny settlement known as Newtown grew around the inn, today the center of Greensburg's Business District at the intersection of Pittsburgh and Main Streets. At Pittsburgh, the wagon trail became Penn Avenue.

Hannastown was the original Westmoreland County seat. According to historian John Boucher, after Hannastown was attacked and burned by "Indians and Tories" in 1782, efforts began to relocate the county seat. On December 10, 1785, county officials contracted with Christopher Truby and William Jack to purchase two acres of land in Newtown on which to erect public buildings. Ludwick Otterman later subscribed to the agreement. Boucher therefore designates December 10, 1785, as the date on which Newtown became the Westmoreland County seat.

The first courthouse and jail were a single building, built of logs and heavy plank. The jail portion had a heavy stone wall that extended some distance above the ground, "perhaps to keep prisoners from cutting their way out". Court was first held in this structure on January 7, 1787. The Westmoreland County Courthouse, in its various incarnations, has stood on this site ever since.  The area surrounding the courthouse became Greensburg ("Greenesburgh", as some documents referred to it at the time). It was named for American Revolutionary War General Nathanael Greene. Greensburg was formally incorporated as a borough on February 9, 1799, making it the first borough in the county.

In the early 19th century, Greensburg had very little growth in population (see population data table in this article). After 1850, Greensburg became a growing county seat with inns and small businesses. A railroad stop and the discovery of large areas of soft coal nearby made it the center of a vigorous mining industry in the late 19th century and early 20th century.

Seton Hill College, formerly St. Joseph's Academy, became a four-year women's institution in 1918. Greensburg became a City of the Third Class on January 2, 1928. After World War II, more residential areas were developed in various sections of town. Greensburg's cultural status grew as the Westmoreland County Museum of Art opened in 1959 and the University of Pittsburgh founded the branch campus, the University of Pittsburgh at Greensburg, in 1963, now located in Hempfield Township.

The opening of Greengate Mall and Westmoreland Mall in 1965 and 1977, respectively, marked a new era for retail shopping in the area but negatively impacted retail businesses in Downtown Greensburg's shopping district. Changes in local shopping habits had already taken their toll by the late 1970s when Troutman's Department Store closed. By the mid-1990s, city officials shifted their revitalization plans on the cultural aspects of Downtown Greensburg, such as the restorations of the Palace Theater and the historic Train Station, as well as a new, recently opened performing arts center for Seton Hill University. Also, in July 2009, Lake Erie College of Osteopathic Medicine, the largest medical school in the country, opened a satellite campus at Seton Hill University. Now over 200 students study at LECOM at Seton Hill every year. As part of this ongoing transition, an expansion of the Westmoreland Museum of American Art was completed in 2015.

The city is home to the Roman Catholic Diocese of Greensburg.

Historical facts 
Greensburg's first log schoolhouse was located at the site of St. Clair Park.
St. Clair Park was originally a cemetery. When the borough banned cemeteries, St. Clair cemetery was moved to its current location, just east of town.
Mid Town Plaza was also originally a cemetery. Most, but not all, of the graves were moved to other area cemeteries upon its redevelopment.
Mt. Odin Park was originally the estate of Dr. Frank Cowan, attorney, physician, author, and former Secretary to President Andrew Johnson. Dr. Cowan willed his land to Greensburg to be used for recreational purposes.

Neighborhoods and wards 
The city of Greensburg is currently composed of eight wards, most of which were formerly boroughs and are divided into several neighborhoods. Bunker Hill, now Fifth Ward, was merged into Greensburg in 1894. The name originated because of fights at the rowdy Bushfield Tavern in the early 1840s to mid-19th century that were compared to the Battle of Bunker Hill.

In 1905, Greensburg absorbed three adjacent boroughs, including Ludwick, now Sixth Ward, which was named for Ludwick Otterman, an early settler for whom the street is also named, as well as East Greensburg, now Seventh Ward, and Southeast Greensburg, unofficially known as Paradise (Eighth Ward). South Maple Avenue was originally named Kinderhook (Third Ward). Second Ward, located north of Downtown Greensburg, is the largest ward and includes the neighborhoods of Saybrook Village, Evergreen Hill, New Salem Acres, Country Club Meadows, Northmont, Devonshire Heights, Rose Fountain Farms, and Academy Hill. Hilltop, a neighborhood in Eighth Ward, was originally settled by Italian immigrants and borders South Greensburg and Underwood on either side. First Ward features Chestnut Hill and Shuey Plan and is also home to Seton Hill University. Other Greensburg neighborhoods include Eastern Estates, Underwood, Shogan, and Hillcrest.

Eighth Ward was originally home to many Italian immigrants from Cercemaggiore, Italy. Today, the original Our Lady of Grace Church, built by the masons from Italy, still stands although used as a residence. The Hilltop Social Club, founded by a few families who lived in the areas of Bierer, Margaret, White, and Catherine Streets, is also located here. Every year it has become a tradition for the firehall in the Eighth Ward to throw a carnival which includes bingo, amusement rides, and of course the famous Shuey Burgers.

Two neighborhoods have been designated as U.S. historic districts, the Greensburg Downtown Historic District and the Academy Hill Historic District. Also listed on the National Register of Historic Places are the Greensburg Railroad Station and Westmoreland County Courthouse.

Demographics 

As of the census of 2000, there were 15,889 people, 7,144 households, and 3,922 families residing in the city. The population density was 3,746.1 people per square mile (1,446.9/km2). There were 7,734 housing units at an average density of 1,823.4 per square mile (704.3/km2). The racial makeup of the city was 93.43% White, 3.91% African American, 0.09% Native American, 0.70% Asian, 0.01% Pacific Islander, 0.38% from other races, and 1.47% from two or more races. Hispanic or Latino of any race were 1.08% of the population.

There were 7,144 households, out of which 24.1% had children under the age of 18 living with them, 39.3% were married couples living together, 12.8% had a female householder with no husband present, and 45.1% were non-families. 39.2% of all households were made up of individuals, and 15.4% had someone living alone who was 65 years of age or older. The average household size was 2.11, and the average family size was 2.85.

In the city, the age distribution of the population shows 20.2% under the age of 18, 10.0% from 18 to 24, 27.9% from 25 to 44, 22.6% from 45 to 64, and 19.3% who were 65 years of age or older. The median age was 39 years. For every 100 females, there were 81.7 males. For every 100 females age 18 and over, there were 76.1 males.

The median income for a household in the city was $30,324, and the median income for a family was $41,112. Males had a median income of $33,306 versus $24,246 for females. The per capita income for the city was $18,312. About 10.8% of families and 13.6% of the population were below the poverty line, including 18.1% of those under age 18 and 11.9% of those age 65 or over.

Government and politics 
Greensburg is an incorporated city governed by Democratic mayor Robert L. Bell and a four-member City Council. The mayor and the City Council members serve four-year terms. The seat of government is the Greensburg City Hall.

The small size of Greensburg has not deterred it from being a player on the political scene. Greensburg has hosted its share of prominent politicians over the years, including a July 1994 visit from then-President Bill Clinton, former Democratic candidate John Kerry and his running mate John Edwards in July 2004 and Democratic candidates Hillary Clinton and Barack Obama in March 2008 and Joe Biden in September 2020. According to local historians, it was also the site of the 1854 National Republican Party convention – the first convention of the Grand Old Republican Party, despite Pittsburgh's claims.

Military 
Greensburg is home to the 14th Quartermaster Detachment, a United States Army Reserve unit. During the Gulf War, the unit took the heaviest casualties of any Coalition unit during the war when an Iraqi missile hit a US Army barracks in Dhahran, Saudi Arabia, on February 25, 1991. The 69-member unit suffered a casualty rate of 81%, including 13 killed. Greensburg's community was heavily affected by these losses. A memorial to the 14th's personnel was constructed at the city's US Army Reserve Center. There is also a National Guard Armory just outside the main City.

Economy 

Originally a railroad stop on the Pennsylvania Railroad, Greensburg quickly became the center of the coal mining industry in the region by the late 19th century when large areas of soft coal were discovered nearby. This contributed to the growth and development of the growing county seat. Many businesses and inns flourished within Downtown Greensburg for many years and once boasted four major department stores – JCPenney, Royers, Sears and its largest department store, Troutman's.

In August 1965, Greengate Mall opened west of the city in Hempfield Township. Greengate was part of the first wave of indoor shopping malls in the country. The mall's opening marked a new era for retail shopping in the area. However, it negatively impacted stand-alone businesses in Greensburg's downtown corridor. By the late 1970s, several local stores, including Troutman's, the city's major department store, closed. The downtown area eventually rebounded as the city became a center for service industries, professional offices, and banking. Today, small downtown shops and a growing number of restaurants are reviving downtown as a mercantile center.

Westmoreland Mall is currently the largest shopping complex in the Greensburg area and Westmoreland County. Greengate Mall suffered losses in the 1990s when anchor store JCPenney relocated to Westmoreland Mall. As the mall continued on its irreversible decline, the nationally based Montgomery Ward and the regional chain Horne's also closed. The building was eventually razed in 2003, and a new shopping center called Greengate Centre, anchored by a Walmart, was subsequently built. Numerous shopping plazas and dining establishments also line the Route 30 corridor east and west of the city.

Light to moderate industry and service industries thrive in the Greater Greensburg area. Several industrial parks are primarily located outside the city limits. In addition, the area is home to two large prisons, the Westmoreland County Prison and the State Correctional Institution at Greensburg, both in Hempfield Township. Housing growth continues on the city's northern end, with the Saybrook Village and Evergreen Hill plans. The opening of the seven-story State Office Building on North Main Street, the completion of the four-story addition to the Courthouse Square Extension, and the Performing Arts Center of Seton Hill University are expected to add new jobs to the city and attract more visitors.

Major employers 
Two major corporations are headquartered in the Greensburg area: Excela Health and the Tribune-Review.

Education

Public schools 

The Greater Greensburg area contains two public school districts. The larger of the two is the Hempfield Area School District. The school district has a resident population of over 50,000, spans approximately ninety-five square miles, and lies thirty miles southeast of Pittsburgh. Comprising Hempfield Township, and the communities of Adamsburg, Armbrust, Bovard, Grapeville, Hannastown, Hunker, Luxor, Manor, New Stanton, and Youngwood, the school district completely surrounds the city of Greensburg. Hempfield is also the largest school district in Westmoreland County, with approximately 7,000 enrolled students and one of Western Pennsylvania's largest.

The second school district servicing Greensburg is the Greensburg Salem School District. The school district covers an area of fifty-one square miles. With an enrollment of 3,600 students, Greensburg Salem serves the City of Greensburg, South Greensburg, Southwest Greensburg and Salem Township. Detailed information, including enrollment figures and test scores about Greensburg Salem, can be found on this website.

Private schools 
Greensburg is home to Greensburg Central Catholic High School and Aquinas Academy (www.aquinasacademy.org), both private Catholic schools.

Colleges and universities 
The immediate vicinity of Greensburg contains two universities – Seton Hill University and the University of Pittsburgh at Greensburg. Seton Hill University was founded in 1885 by the Sisters of Charity on a bluff overlooking the City of Greensburg. Formerly a women's college, Seton Hill became a coeducational university in 2002. In recent years, Seton Hill has begun to expand into the downtown area by constructing several academic buildings and a performing arts center. The Greensburg campus of the University of Pittsburgh was founded in 1963 in Downtown Greensburg. It would later grow into a large campus in nearby Hempfield Township. It was voted "Best University in the Region" for eight straight years (1999–2007) by the Tribune-Review. In addition, the branches of Carlow University, Lake Erie College of Osteopathic Medicine and Triangle Tech are located within the Greater Greensburg area.

The campuses of Saint Vincent College and Westmoreland County Community College are also located in the nearby communities of Latrobe and Youngwood, respectively.

Libraries 
The Greensburg Hempfield Area Library serves the City of Greensburg and Hempfield Township.

Arts and culture 

Greensburg is a major cultural center in Western Pennsylvania. It is the home of the Westmoreland Museum of American Art, which specializes in American Art circa 1750–1950. In the heart of the city's emerging cultural district, the Palace Theatre is the site for various performances throughout the year. Additionally, it is the home of the Westmoreland Symphony Orchestra and the Summer Sounds Concert Series at the Robertshaw Amphitheater in St. Clair Park.

The Westmoreland Cultural Trust has played a major role in the revitalization of Downtown Greensburg in recent years. Its accomplishments include the ongoing renovation of the Palace Theatre and the restoration (Before/After Pictures) of the circa 1910 Train Station. They are also responsible for renovating several commercial buildings in the downtown area.

Stage Right! also contributes to the region's culture, offering classes in musical theatre for young people and staging professional productions at the Palace Theater and Greensburg Garden and Civic Center.

Greensburg Civic Theatre, one of the few long-established volunteer-based community theatre organizations in Westmoreland County, has been presenting both adult and children's theater productions for over 60 years. Founded in 1951, they are the resident theatre company at the Greensburg Garden and Civic Center.

The Performance Arts Center of Seton Hill University opened its doors to the public in September 2009. This multimillion-dollar complex, located in the city's Cultural District, is expected to serve as an additional catalyst for the future growth of the downtown core.

A hands-on science center, to feature a wide range of interactive exhibits, was proposed for the former Mellon Bank building downtown. However, it has since been put on hold indefinitely. The Discovery & Interactive Science Center (DISC) would have been a regional attraction for Westmoreland, Fayette, Indiana, Somerset, and Bedford counties. It would have also been the only interactive science center between the Carnegie Science Center in Pittsburgh and the Harsco Science Center in Harrisburg.

Cultural facts 
Just north of Greensburg is Old Hanna's Town, the first county seat west of the Appalachian Mountains.
Greensburg is home to a great deal of interesting architecture, including many historic and large homes and many old churches and cathedrals. The inner city has many small 1950s-style shops and restaurants.
The World Conference Center for The Church of Jesus Christ is located west of Greensburg on PA Route 136. It is the third-largest branch of the Latter Day Saint movement.
The national headquarters of the Kappa Delta Rho fraternity is in Greensburg.
The Saint Emma Monastery (founded 1931) is a Roman Catholic retreat house and monastery for the Sisters of Saint Benedict located in Greensburg.
Greensburg is host to the annual White Out Bar Crawl held every August.

Media 
Greensburg, the county seat of Westmoreland County, is located close (approximately 30 miles southeast) to the city of Pittsburgh in Allegheny County and receives radio and television stations that are based out of the larger city, Pittsburgh. Locally though, Greensburg and its surrounding area are served by several local radio stations licensed to various nearby Westmoreland County communities.

Most of the local Westmoreland County radio stations serving the Greensburg area are owned by Broadcast Communications, Inc.(BCI). BCI is locally owned and operated by Greensburg, PA residents, Robert & Ashley Stevens. These local BCI stations include: 103.1 WKVE (album-oriented rock), 103.9 WKHB-FM (adult contemporary), 97.5 770 WKFB (oldies), and 92.3 620 WKHB (variety-including: talk, classic hits, ethnic, and ministry), which originally was WHJB commencing broadcasting on October 28 in 1934 as Westmoreland County's first radio station, broadcasting and actually transmitting (during its early years) with a roof-mounted antenna system from the Penn Albert Hotel in downtown Greensburg but modifying the call sign to WKHB circa 2000 when the station upgraded its facilities to cover a much broader regional southwestern Pennsylvania area.
Renda Broadcasting also serves the Greensburg area with 107.1 WHJB (classic hits). Originally a sister station to 620 WKHB when 620 was WHJB. The 107.1 frequency has had various call signs and formats over several years. Originally under the ownership of Mel Goldberg, the station was WHJB-FM briefly in the mid-1960s, then becoming WOKU for many years until it became WSSZ (Z107) in the early 1980s with a Top 40 format and then briefly WPNT in the mid-1980s for less than a year before reverting to WSSZ which would become a classic hits format by the early 1990s that ended abruptly when Mel Goldberg sold the station to Sheridan Broadcasting out of Pittsburgh which began a simulcast of the urban contemporary format of 106.7 WAMO, which also included another call sign change to WJJJ in 2004 that would last until 2006 when the station sold to Renda Broadcasting and was reintroduced locally as WGSM (Sam FM). The station finally adopted the call sign WHJB circa 2010.
To a much lesser degree, the translator 98.7 W254CR, which rebroadcasts the programming of 910 WXJX-AM Apollo, Armstrong County, also provides radio service with an adult hits music format known as "Jack FM", which was launched on December 31, 2018.
Greensburg's major newspaper is the Tribune-Review, owned by the Tribune-Review Publishing Company. In 1992, this company founded the Pittsburgh Tribune Review, a competitor to the Pittsburgh Post-Gazette. This occurred immediately following the demise of the Pittsburgh Press. The Tribune-Review Publishing Company was owned by a noted philanthropist and conservative figure Richard Mellon Scaife. Since starting the Pittsburgh Tribune Review, the original Tribune-Review that circulates in and around Greensburg has upgraded its national and international news coverage but continues to maintain a robust local news section. The Pittsburgh edition closed in 2016.  The Greensburg edition remains.
LCS Hockey, a newsletter turned internationally renowned website, was founded in Greensburg.
In 2004, Greensburg attorney P. Louis DeRose published the book, Greensburg through the Arcadia Publishing Images of America Series.
In 2006, Greensburg resident Rachel E. Smith published the book, Greensburg through the Arcadia Publishing Postcard History Series.

Greensburg in fiction 
Mystery novel writer K. C. Constantine has used various elements of Greensburg as a basis for the fictional town of Rocksburg in his novels.

Professional sports

American football

From 1890 until 1900, Greensburg was the home of the Greensburg Athletic Association, one of the earliest professional football teams. The team began as an amateur football club in 1890 and was composed primarily of locals before several paid players were added for 1895. In 1894 it was discovered that the team had secretly paid formerly Indiana Normal (now Indiana University of Pennsylvania) player, Lawson Fiscus, to play football and retained his services on salary. The team was the chief rival of another early professional football team, the Latrobe Athletic Association.

On December 3, 1898, two players from the Greensburg Athletic Association joined with the Latrobe Athletic Association to form the very first professional football all-star team for a game against the Duquesne Country and Athletic Club, to be played at Pittsburgh's Exposition Park. Duquesne went on to win the game 16–0.

Aside from Fiscus, the Greensburg Athletic Association included several of the era's top players, such as: Charlie Atherton, George Barclay, Ross Fiscus, Jack Gass, Arthur McFarland, Charles Rinehart, Isaac Seneca and Adam Martin Wyant. Several of these players revolutionized the game during their playing careers. Charlie Atherton is credited with inventing the place kick, and George Barclay invented the first-ever football helmet. Meanwhile, Isaac Seneca became the first Native-American to earn All-American honors and Adam Wyant made history by becoming the first professional football player to be elected to the United States Congress.

Baseball
In 1907, Greensburg fielded the Greensburg Red Sox, a Minor League Baseball team in the Class D Western Pennsylvania League that played for one season in 1907. Then from 1934 until 1939, Greensburg was also the home of the Greensburg Red Wings, a Class D Minor League Baseball team was affiliated with the St. Louis Cardinals, Brooklyn Dodgers and Washington Senators. The team's name changed several times over the years. In 1934, the team was founded as the Greensburg Trojans. A year later, they took on the Red Wings moniker. By 1937, the team was renamed the Greensburg Green Sox and finally the Greensburg Senators in 1939.

Transportation

Highways 

The east-west U.S. Route 30 expressway bypasses Greensburg to the south, as does the north–south Pennsylvania Turnpike 66 to the west. A proposed highway called the Laurel Valley Expressway was initially planned to be built to the east of Greensburg, primarily in Unity, Derry, and Mount Pleasant townships, but that project has never materialized. The Pennsylvania Turnpike's New Stanton exit is approximately six miles (9 km) south of Greensburg on U.S. Route 119 where Interstate 70 splits from Interstate 76. The Turnpike's Irwin exit is located about seven miles west of the city on U.S. Route 30. PA Routes 66 and 136 begin in Greensburg. PA Routes 130, 819, and U.S. Route 119 pass through the city. U.S. Route 22, a major connector from Central to Southwestern Pennsylvania, runs approximately seven miles north of the city through Salem Township, accessible by routes 66, 819, and 119.

Public transportation 
Westmoreland Transit is the mass transit system of Greensburg and Westmoreland County. It operates bus routes seven days a week throughout the city, the county, and to Pittsburgh. Greyhound Lines runs regularly scheduled bus service to and from Greensburg from many hubs, including Pittsburgh, Chicago, and New York City.

Airports 
Air service is available at the Pittsburgh International Airport and the Arnold Palmer Regional Airport east of Greensburg in nearby Latrobe.

Rail 
The city has Amtrak rail service at the restored Train Station, as well as freight rail operator Norfolk Southern and an independent shortline railroad connecting coal mines and businesses located south of the city to the Norfolk Southern line just west of Greensburg.

Bicycling 
Greensburg is bike-friendly as it offers the Five Star Trail, which begins at Lynch Field and ends south of the city in Armbrust.

Infrastructure

Utilities 
Electricity for Greensburg and a large portion of Westmoreland County is supplied by West Penn Power, a division of FirstEnergy. In addition, natural gas is widely used in the area due to large reserves existing throughout the region. Service is provided by Peoples Natural Gas Company and Columbia Natural Gas Company.
Water utility service is provided by the Municipal Authority of Westmoreland County (MAWC). Waste collection and sewage utilities are provided by Advanced Disposal and the Greater Greensburg Sewage Authority, respectively.

Medical facilities 
The Greater Greensburg area is home to several medical facilities, ranging from independent clinics and urgent care centers to full-service hospitals. The following listing is not exhaustive.

 Aestique Medical Center
 AHN Hempfield Hospital
 Bio-Medical Applications of Greensburg
 Excela Westmoreland Hospital
 Greensburg Care Center
 Innovative Health Services
 Laurel Surgical Center
 MedExpress Urgent Care Center
 West Place

Telecommunications 
Greensburg is located within the 724 area code, which surrounds the 412 area code assigned to the city of Pittsburgh and most of Allegheny County, along with small portions of Washington and Westmoreland counties. In 2013, the overlay code 878 was approved for use in the area.

Notable people 

Karen Angle – ex-wife of professional wrestler Kurt Angle; current Total Nonstop Action Wrestling performer
 Carroll Baker - actress; attended Greensburg Salem High School
Paul Bartholomew – architect of various Greensburg landmarks and designer of Norvelt, Pennsylvania
Randy Bish – editorial cartoonist
 Scott G. Bullock – public interest lawyer who focuses on property rights issues such as eminent domain and civil forfeiture
James Clarke – third Governor of Iowa Territory
K.C. Constantine – mystery fiction author
Stephen Dau – author
Brett Detar – songwriter, musician, and record producer
Rebecca Franklin – food writer
Todd Gallagher – social scientist, author, filmmaker, and comedian
Doc Gessler - Major League Baseball outfielder
Paul Gilbert – guitarist for the bands Racer X and Mr. Big
Ikki Twins, models
Jesse Root Grant – father of Union general and 18th President, Ulysses S. Grant
Zach Jackson – Major League Baseball pitcher
Greg Jones – highly accomplished collegiate wrestler at West Virginia University
Sheila Kelley – actress
Peggy King – 1950s and 1960s pop singer and television personality
John Latta (1836-1913) - First Lieutenant Governor of Pennsylvania
Rocco Mediate – professional golfer
Vic Mignogna – voice actor
Rikki & Vikki Mongeon, reality TV personalities better known as the Ikki Twins
Arthur St. Clair (1737-1818), Major General and Patriot in the revolutionary war, 9th President of the Continental Congress (see also Fort Ligonier)
Jacob Turney (1825-1891), U.S. Congressman
Bruce Weber – fashion photographer
James C. White – radio personality
Cyrus E. Woods – lawyer and politician
Jacob Zimmerman – Illinois politician, newspaper editor, newspaper owner, and businessman

Sister cities 

 – Belize City, Belize
 – Cercemaggiore, Molise

See also 
Academy Hill Historic District
Arnold Palmer Regional Airport
Greensburg Downtown Historic District
Kecksburg UFO Incident
Seton Hill University
University of Pittsburgh at Greensburg

References

External links 
City website
Greensburg's Main Street Memories

 
Cities in Westmoreland County, Pennsylvania
County seats in Pennsylvania
Populated places established in 1782
Pittsburgh metropolitan area
Academic enclaves
Cities in Pennsylvania
1782 establishments in Pennsylvania